Willem Alexander Arnold Peter Minne Endstra (12 January 1953 – 17 May 2004) was a Dutch real estate trader.

Biography
Endstra worked in his parents' real estate business and studied law at the Vrije Universiteit, and started his own business, Convoy Vastgoed BV, in 1987.

In 1992 Endstra was investigated for allegedly using his business for money laundering the profits of a criminal gang dealing in ecstasy. The case was closed when Endstra made a deal with public prosecutors in Amsterdam worth about €450 thousand to prevent criminal prosecution.

Dutch criminal John Mieremet claimed in 2002 that, together with Sam Klepper, he was brought into contact with Endstra via Heineken-kidnapper Willem Holleeder. Mieremet also believed that Endstra was behind a recent attempt on his life. Endstra denied these allegations, but when a picture of Endstra was published in the magazine Quote later that year, Endstra was seen sitting with Holleeder on a bench in front of Endstra's offices. That same magazine reported Endstra's net worth that year to be around €350 million.

When another person involved in the kidnapping of Heineken, Cor van Hout, was murdered in 2003, informants told the Amsterdam police that Endstra would be next.

May 2004

On 14 May 2004, Dutch police announced they would not look further into money laundering allegations against Endstra. Two days later, Endstra appeared on the television program Business Class, saying that after all these years of investigating without finding anything concrete, the authorities should leave him alone now. The day after the broadcast, on 17 May, Endstra was shot down near his offices in Amsterdam. He died later that day in a hospital (and was later buried at Zorgvlied cemetery). The shooter remains unknown.

Aftermath

Some time later it became public knowledge that Endstra had tried to plot Holleeder's murder by hiring some Hells Angels. Also it became apparent that Endstra had likely been extorted by Holleeder since 2002. Holleeder himself was arrested in 2006 for this act among others.

According to a story in Dutch newspaper Het Parool in March 2006, Endstra had on more than one occasion talked to police about the criminal environment of Amsterdam. Altogether these interviews resulted in more than 200 pages of notes. In them, Endstra told the police that Holleeder was behind the murders of 25 people, including Cor van Hout, Sam Klepper, Jan Femer, George Plieger, Magdi Barsoum, Jules Jie and Gijs van Dam.

1953 births
2004 deaths
Deaths by firearm in the Netherlands
Dutch murder victims
People murdered in the Netherlands
Businesspeople from Amsterdam
People murdered by Dutch organized crime
20th-century Dutch businesspeople
Unsolved murders in the Netherlands